In molecular biology, WT1 antisense RNA (non-protein coding), also known as WT1-AS or WIT1, is a long non-coding RNA. In humans, it is found on chromosome 11 and is expressed in kidney. It is transcribed in the opposite direction to the WT1 gene. It is functionally imprinted in the human kidney, where only the paternal allele is expressed, but not in the foetal kidney.

See also
 Long noncoding RNA

References

Further reading

Non-coding RNA